The Harangi Dam is located near Hudgur village, kushalnagar taluk in Kodagu district in the Indian state of Karnataka. The masonry dam is built across the river Harangi, a tributary of the Kaveri. The dam is located about 9 km away from the heart of Kushalnagar town.

The Harangi originates in the Pushpagiri Hills of Western Ghats in Kodagu, Karnataka. Heavy rainfall from the south-west monsoon is the source of water in the catchment area of Harangi river which is about 419.58 km2. The length of the Harangi from its origin to the confluence with the Kaveri river is 50 km. The Harangi joins the Kaveri near Kudige, 5 km north of Kushalnagar.

Hydroelectric Project
Harangi hydroelectric project was set up by Energy Development Company Limited (EDCL) on the Left bank of Harangi Dam, parallel to left bank irrigation canal. The 9 megawatt (2×4.5 MW) project was started in April  1997, and was fully into commercial operation by July 1999. It falls under the "Small" category of hydropower projects (3-25 MW).

Phase-II of the project is to install a 6 megawatt unit, currently under planning.

Notes

External links
 Location on wikimapia

Dams in Karnataka
Buildings and structures in Kodagu district
Geography of Kodagu district
Year of establishment missing